Manotinae is a subfamily of fungus gnats (insects in the family Mycetophilidae).

Genera
Alavamanota Blagoderov & Arillo, 2002
Eumanota Edwards, 1933
Manota Williston, 1896
Paramanota Tuomikoski, 1966
Promanota Tuomikoski, 1966

References

Mycetophilidae
Nematocera subfamilies